A county seat war is an American phenomenon that occurred mainly in the Old West as it was being settled and county lines determined. Incidents elsewhere, such as in Michigan, Appalachian Ohio, and West Virginia, have also been recorded.  As new towns sprang up and county lines were drawn, there was intense competition for the status and tax benefits bestowed by becoming a county seat.  These "wars" often involved nothing more than lining up at the ballot box, but sometimes partisans for a particular town would resort to voter fraud, intimidation, or violence.

History
The fight between Coronado and neighboring Leoti in western Kansas is considered the bloodiest occurrence of this phenomenon. Leoti hired lawmen Wyatt Earp and Bat Masterson from Dodge City, Kansas to help win the fight. 

Another violent county seat war in Kansas resulted in the Hay Meadow Massacre in Stevens County. 

Yet another Kansas county seat war resulted in the dissolution of a county when Eminence and Ravanna fought over the privilege of being the county seat for Garfield County. When people in the county suggested the county be surveyed, it was found that it was too small to be a legal county under a Kansas law established in the late 19th century (Wyandotte County had been founded before this law was passed). Garfield County was then dissolved and annexed into Finney County, which is why that county has a panhandle.

By the late 19th century, battles over county seats were settled in elections that saw voter fraud, intimidation, and heated debates, as seen in the relocation of several Washington county seats in the late 19th century: Lincoln County from Sprague to Davenport, and Snohomish County from Snohomish to Everett. 

In Spokane County, an armed mob from Cheney forcibly seized county records from the elected seat of Spokane Falls (now Spokane), in 1881. Spokane became the county seat in an 1886 election.

See also

 Coal Wars
 Railroad Wars
 Range war
 Sheep Wars

References

External links
West Virginia newspaper clips about county seat wars

Feuds in the United States
American frontier
Political history of the United States
Wars involving the United States
Internal wars of the United States